Danewal , is a town and union council in the suburb of Vehari in Vehari District of the Punjab province of Pakistan.

Populated places in Vehari District